Hakob Meghapart (Jacob the Sinner) (date of birth and death are unknown), was the first Armenian printer, the founder of the Armenian printing. His activities were developed in Venice in the beginning of the 16th century.
In 1512-1513 his publishing house gave birth to the following publications:
Urbatagirk
Pataragatetr
Aghtark
Parzatumar
Tagharan

The first book that he printed was called "Urbatagirk", which had 124 paper pages, also 24 are colored and the pages are printed in red and black.
The books printed by him have a special printer's mark.

See also
Armenian printing

References

 G. Levonyan, Armenian book and Art of the printing [«Հայ գիրքը և տպագրության արվեստը»], Yerevan, 1958

External links
 Parzatumar

Armenian printers
Year of birth unknown
Year of death unknown